Boophis elenae is a species of frog in the family Mantellidae.
It is endemic to Madagascar, known only from Ranomafana National Park (where it is abundant) and Farimazava Forest in Antoetra.
Its natural habitats are subtropical or tropical moist lowland forests, subtropical or tropical moist montane forests, rivers, arable land, plantations, rural gardens, and heavily degraded former forest.
It is threatened by habitat loss for agriculture, timber extraction, charcoal manufacturing, invasive eucalyptus, livestock grazing and expanding human settlements.

Sources
 Andreone, F., Vences, M. & Glaw, F. 2004.  Boophis elenae   2006 IUCN Red List of Threatened Species.   Downloaded on 23 July 2007.

External links

Elenae
Endemic frogs of Madagascar
Amphibians described in 1993
Taxonomy articles created by Polbot